Wet Hare is a 1962 Warner Bros. Looney Tunes cartoon directed by Robert McKimson. The short was released on January 20, 1962, and stars Bugs Bunny. In the cartoon, Bugs finds himself at odds with a ruthless lumberjack who wants to control the water supply by building a series of dams.

Plot
Bugs Bunny is taking his morning shower under a waterfall when the water stops flowing. The source of the problem turns out to be the villainous Blacque Jacque Shellacque, who has built an illegal rock dam in an effort to control the water supply and sell it at inflated prices. Bugs tricks Jacque into removing a tiny rock, at the dam's base, which then dislodges the dam. Shellacque builds a series of dams, each one bigger than the last, with Bugs destroying them all. Shellacque builds a steel dam only to find that there is no water flowing as finally, Bugs turns the tables and builds a series of rock dams of his own (in revenge for Jacques shooting his grammaphone thinking it was Bugs). Their roles reverse as Shellacque destroys dam after dam, ending with his being arrested for attempting to destroy the "Grand Cooler Dam" (a pun on "Grand Coulee Dam").

References

External links

 Wet Hare at the Internet Movie Database
 Wet Hare at the Big Cartoon DataBase

1962 films
1962 animated films
1962 short films
1960s American animated films
1960s Warner Bros. animated short films
Looney Tunes shorts
Films directed by Robert McKimson
Films scored by Milt Franklyn
Bugs Bunny films
1960s English-language films